Robert Eibach is an American, multi-Grammy and Latin Grammy Award nominated artist, producer, recording engineer, musician, DJ and remixer. Eibach is a band member and one of the producers on The Lucky Band album Paseo Lunar, which was nominated for a 2020 Latin Grammy Award in the Children's category.  He worked on Winds of Samsara by Ricky Kej and Wouter Kellerman, which won a Grammy® Award for Best New Age Album. Also, Eibach contributed his work on Wouter Kellerman's 2015 album Love Language, which earned a Grammy® Nomination for Best Contemporary Instrumental Album.  In 2015, Lucky Diaz and The Family Jam Band earned a Latin Grammy Award nomination for their children's album Adelante, which Eibach was an engineer on. Eibach contributed Billboard charting remixes for Ariana Grande, Taylor Swift, Mark Ronson, Camila Cabello, Jennifer Lopez among others.  He is performing as the DJ on tour with David Longoria in support of Longoria's album The Journey and song We Are One. In 2019, The Lucky Band won the Latin Grammy Award for Best Children's Album with Buenos Diaz, which included Robert Eibach remixes. Eibach's first single as the main recording artist, Play With You, was released on August 21, 2020.  Robert Eibach earned his first Grammy nomination as a member of Lucky Diaz and The Family Jam Band for their release Crayon Kids in the Best Children's Album category at the 64th Grammy Awards.The album Los Fabulosos by Lucky Diaz and The Family Jam Band was also nominated for a 65th Grammy Award in the Children's Category, which featured Eibach's remix of Mi Gusta, as well as his contributions as a musician and engineer.

Early life 
Robert Eibach was born July 6 in Scranton, Pennsylvania, and attended college at Temple University in Philadelphia, Pennsylvania. While in college, Eibach began recording and remixing songs.  He moved to Los Angeles, CA after graduating school.

Productions and remixes 
Robert Eibach remixed Karine Hannah's song Victory, which peaked at #14 on the Billboard Club Play Chart on October 8, 2016.

Sunshine Stills won the Hollywood Music In Media Award for Best American/Folk/Acoustic album in 2016 with Twist of Fate.  Eibach produced and engineered the album, as well as a contributing band member playing keyboards and co-writing the songs.  He also produced and co-wrote the song Angels, the lead single from Longoria's album The Journey, which won the Hollwood Music in Media Award for Best EDM Song in 2016.

In 2017, Eibach remixed Lisa Cole's single Lost Love and Tami's single The Sugar Shack which both peaked at #11 on the Billboard Club Play Chart. He was also a remixer on the 20th Anniversary release of Smash Mouth's song Walkin' On The Sun which reached #5 on the Billboard Club Play Chart on October 7, 2017.  Eibach's remix also featured David Longoria on trumpet. David Longoria's international instrumental album El Viaje, which Eibach produced with him, was released on May 15, 2017.

As a remixer, Robert Eibach was involved in April Diamond's first single Lose Control, as well as Selena Gomez and popular edm DJ Marshmello's single Wolves, which he also mashed up for a club mix.  Both songs peaked on the Billboard Club Play Chart in early 2018.Ariana Grande reached #1 on the Billboard Dance Club Songs with No Tears Left To Cry on June 23, 2018, which featured Eibach as one of the remixers with Stonebridge, Barry Harris and others. He also produced, remixed and co-wrote Ani's debut song Dance The Night Away, which peaked at #33 on the Billboard Dance Club Songs chart on July 28, 2018.Ani's second single Confession, peaked at #14 on the Billboard Dance Club Songs chart on September 28, 2019, which was also produced, remixed and co-written by Eibach.

Eibach's remix of Taylor Swift's lead single Me!, which features Panic! at the Disco's lead singer Brendon Urie, was the iDJPool #1 Remix Pick of the Week for the week 06-23-2019 to 06-29-2019, and also peaked at #8 on the Billboard Dance Club Songs chart on July 13, 2019.

According to Billboard Magazine, Eibach remixed Mark Ronson's song Find U Again featuring vocalist Camila Cabello.  The song reached #1 on the Billboard Dance Club Songs chart October 19, 2019, which was the fourth time for Ronson and Cabello's first on that chart.

The Lucky Band won their second Latin Grammy Award for Best Children's Album with Buenos Diaz in 2019, which included Robert Eibach remixes such as the single Estrellita featuring David Longoria on trumpet. Eibach joined The Lucky Band as a musician and producer for their 2020 release Paseo Lunar, which was nominated for a Latin Grammy Award in the Children's category.

On August 21, 2020, Robert Eibach released his first single as the main recording artist entitled Play With You.  The song features Elle Dubleu on lead vocals.  Play With You was the iDJPool #8 Dance Pick Hit for week August 23–29, 2020 and is nominated for a 2020 Hollywood Music In Media Award in the EDM Category for September.

Awards and Nominations

Discography

References

External links 
 Robert Eibach Official Website

Record producers from Pennsylvania
American DJs
Remixers
American electronic musicians
Living people
Year of birth missing (living people)
People from Scranton, Pennsylvania
Temple University alumni
Electronic dance music DJs